Zaglyptus is a genus of ichneumon wasps in the family Ichneumonidae. There are at least 20 described species in Zaglyptus.

Species
These 23 species belong to the genus Zaglyptus:

 Zaglyptus ankaratrus Seyrig, 1934 c g
 Zaglyptus arizonicus Townes, 1960 c g
 Zaglyptus chavesi Gauld, 1991 c g
 Zaglyptus cortesi Porter, 1979 c g
 Zaglyptus divaricatus Baltazar, 1961 c g
 Zaglyptus facifidus Baltazar, 1961 c g
 Zaglyptus formosus Cushman, 1933 c g
 Zaglyptus glaber Gupta, 1961 c g
 Zaglyptus glabrinotus (Girault, 1925) c g
 Zaglyptus grandis Gupta, 1961 c g
 Zaglyptus hollowayi Gauld, 1984 c g
 Zaglyptus indicus Gupta, 1961 c g
 Zaglyptus iwatai (Uchida, 1936) c g
 Zaglyptus miarus Gupta, 1961 c g
 Zaglyptus multicolor (Gravenhorst, 1829) c g
 Zaglyptus nigrolineatus Gupta, 1961 c g
 Zaglyptus pictilis Townes, 1960 c g b
 Zaglyptus romeroae Gauld, 1991 c g
 Zaglyptus rufus Hellen, 1949 c g
 Zaglyptus semirufus Momoi, 1970 c g
 Zaglyptus trituberculatus (Benoit, 1953) c g
 Zaglyptus varipes (Gravenhorst, 1829) c g b
 Zaglyptus wuyiensis He, 1984 c g

Data sources: i = ITIS, c = Catalogue of Life, g = GBIF, b = Bugguide.net

References

Further reading

 
 

Pimplinae